Iulică Cazan (born 23 August 1980) is a Romanian sports shooter. He competed in the men's 25 metre rapid fire pistol event at the 2000 Summer Olympics.

References

1980 births
Living people
Romanian male sport shooters
Olympic shooters of Romania
Shooters at the 2000 Summer Olympics
People from Budești